The Battle of San Francisco was an engagement during the War of the Pacific (1879–1883) between Chile and the Allied Forces of Peru and Bolivia. It was fought on November 19, 1880, with the forces aligned as follows:

Abbreviations used

Military rank
 MG = Major general
 BG = Brigadier general
 Col = Colonel
 Ltc = Lieutenant colonel
 Maj = Major
 Cpt = Captain
 Lt = 1st lieutenant

Chilean North Operations Army 
General Staff
Col Emilio Sotomayor Baeza
Col Arístides Martínez

Southern Peruvian Army
General Staff
MG Juan Buendía
Col Belisario Suárez

References

Bibliography

War of the Pacific orders of battle